Sex, Love, and Gender: A Kantian Theory is a 2020 book by Helga Varden in which the author tries to apply Kantian thought to subjects such as philosophy of love and philosophy of sex.

Reception
The book was reviewed by Melissa Seymour Fahmy in Mind, by Charlotte Sabourin in Kantian Review and by Lina Papadaki in Con-Textos Kantianos.

It was also reviewed by Jennifer Ryan Lockhart (Auburn University), Carol Hay (University of Massachusetts Lowell) and Janelle DeWitt (University of California Los Angeles) followed by a reply by Varden in SGIR Review.

References

External links 
 Sex, Love, and Gender: A Kantian Theory

2020 non-fiction books
Oxford University Press books
Books about the philosophy of love
English-language books
Books about the philosophy of sexuality
Books about Immanuel Kant